A headmaster/headmistress, head instructor, bureaucrat, head teacher, head, chancellor, principal or school director (sometimes another title is used) is the staff member of a school with the greatest responsibility for the management of the school. In some English-speaking countries, the title for this role is principal.

Description
School principals are stewards of learning and managing supervisors of their schools. They aim to provide vision and leadership to all stakeholders in the school and create a safe and peaceful environment to achieve the mission of learning and educating at the highest level.  They guide the day to day school business and oversee all activities conducted by the school. They bear the responsibility of all decision making and are accountable for their efforts to elevate the school to the best level of learning achievements for the students, best teaching skills for the teachers and best work environment for support staff.

Role
While some head teachers still do some teaching themselves, in most larger schools, most of their duties are managerial and pastoral. They are often used to discipline misbehaving students, help organize school sponsored activities and teachers report to them. 

In Australia, the head teacher is sometimes in charge of one (in the case of a major subject) or multiple (often in smaller schools) specific departments, such as English, history, maths, science, writing, technology, etc., but maintains full teaching duties and status. They are considered part of the school executive, and often a head teacher position is a stepping-stone into administration.

Executive head

Deputy head

Assistants
In larger schools, the principal is assisted by one or more "vice-principals", "assistant principals", "associate principals", or "deputy principals".  Their position is secondary to the principal with regard to school governance. Assistant principals generally perform specific duties such as handling student discipline, curriculum, student council or student activities whereas the principal has the ultimate responsibility for the school as a whole (including faculty and staff, physical plant, etc.).

Regional information

Australia and New Zealand 
In many Australian and New Zealand schools, a headmaster/principal is the head administrator of a school who has been appointed to her/his position by the school board, superintendent, or other body. The principal, often in conjunction with the school board, makes the executive decisions that govern the school, as well as having the authority over the employment (and in some cases firing) of teachers. The principal is often the chief disciplinarian of the students.

Impact of school principals
While there has been considerable anecdotal discussion about the importance of school principals, there has been very little systematic research into their impact on student outcomes. Recent analysis in the United States has examined how the gains in student achievement at a school change after the principal changes. This outcome-based approach to measuring effectiveness of principals is very similar to the value-added modeling that has been applied to the evaluation of teachers. Such research in the state of Texas found that principals have a very large impact on student achievement. Effective school principals have been shown to significantly improve the performance of all students at the school, at least in part through their impacts on selection and retention of good teachers. Ineffective principals have a similarly large negative effect on school performance, suggesting that issues of evaluation are as important for school administrators as they are for teachers. The impact of principals has also been measured in non-traditional ways. Some principals have focused their efforts on creating more inclusive schools for students with disabilities.

See also
 Dean (education)
 Executive head teacher
 Deputy head teacher
School governor
 Schoolmaster
 Vice-principal

References

External links

Association of head teacher School and College Leaders
National Association of Head Teachers (England, Wales & Northern Ireland)
Society of Headmasters and Headmistresses of Independent Schools
Headmasters' and Headmistresses' Conference
International Confederation of head teacher
Australian Secondary head teacher  Association
German information for Head Teachers

Education and training occupations
Academic administrators
Positions of authority